Dempster is a surname. Notable people with the surname include:

 Arthur Jeffrey Dempster, Canadian physicist who discovered the 235U uranium isotope
 Arthur P. Dempster, American mathematician who, with Glenn Shafer, created the Dempster-Shafer theory of evidence
 Barry Dempster, Canadian writer
 Carol Dempster, American actress
 Charles Edward Dempster (1839–1907), Western Australian politician
 Charlotte Louisa Hawkins Dempster (1835–1913), British writer and folklorist
 Dallas Dempster, Australian businessman
 Edith Pretty (née Dempster) (1883–1942), English landowner who donated the Sutton Hoo treasure
 Edward Dempster (fl. 1667–1669), buccaneer who raided the Spanish alongside Henry Morgan
 Eric Dempster, New Zealand cricketer
 Everett Dempster, American geneticist
 George Dempster (lawyer), Scottish lawyer and MP
 George Roby Dempster, U.S. businessman and politician, founder of Dempster Brothers, Inc. 
 Graham Dempster, Australian rules football player
 Hugh Dempster, British actor
 Jocky Dempster, Scottish footballer
 John Dempster (Medal of Honor), American Civil War sailor
 John Dempster (footballer), English footballer
 Leeann Dempster, chief executive of Hibernian F.C.
 Mary Dempster (born 1955), Canadian volleyball player
 Nigel Dempster,  British journalist, author and broadcaster
 Quentin Dempster, Australian journalist
 Rebecca Dempster (born 1991), Scottish footballer
 Roland T. Dempster, Liberian writer
 Ryan Dempster, Canadian-born American baseball player
 Sean Dempster, Australian rules football player
 Stephen Dempster, Canadian religious scholar
 Stewie Dempster, New Zealand cricketer
 Stuart Dempster, American musician
 Thomas Dempster, Scottish scholar and historian
 Walter Dempster, Philippine drag queen and World War II sex slave